Quiina florida is a species of tree in the Ochnaceae family.

It can be found in countries like Bolivia, Brazil, Colombia, Ecuador, Peru, and Venezuela.

References 

Ochnaceae